Florida's 25th congressional district is a congressional district in the Greater Miami area of Florida. In the 2020 redistricting cycle, it was drawn as a successor to the previous 23rd district and includes much of southern Broward County, including Weston, Davie, Pembroke Pines, Hollywood, and parts of Miramar and Plantation. The previous iteration of the 25th district, which stretched from Collier County to the suburbs of Miami, was instead renamed the 26th district.

The prior 25th district, from 2003 through 2013, stretched across a great swath of the Everglades and included parts of Collier, Miami-Dade, and Hendry counties. It took in the Miami-Dade municipalities of Homestead, Leisure City, and Cutler Bay. 

In the 2010 redistricting cycle, much of this area was redrawn into the 26th district, while the 25th district was reconfigured from what was the 21st district from 1993 to 2003. From 2017 to 2023, the district included all of Hendry County, most of Collier County excluding the coastal fringe, and the northwest of Miami-Dade County. Major cities in the district included Hialeah, Doral, LaBelle, and Clewiston. Previous iterations of the district had a large Cuban American population, making up 44.3% of the population, the largest proportion in any district in the country.

The district is currently represented by Democrat Debbie Wasserman Schultz, who previously represented the 23rd district before redistricting.

Statewide election results

Presidential election results
Results from previous presidential elections

Non-presidential results
Results from previous non-presidential statewide elections

List of members representing the district

Election results

2002

2004

2006

2008

2010

NOTE: Rory Arrojo ran as a candidate on the Tea Party platform on the ballot.
NOTE: Craig Porter ran as a candidate on the Florida Whig Party platform on the ballot.

2012

2014

2016

2018

2020

2022

References

 Congressional Biographical Directory of the United States 1774–present

External links
Rep. David Rivera's Official House of Representatives Website

25
Constituencies established in 2003
2003 establishments in Florida